The Obbia lark (Spizocorys obbiensis) is a species of lark in the family Alaudidae. It is found in central Somalia, where it is endemic. Its natural habitat is sub-tropical or tropical dry shrubland.

Formerly or presently, some authorities classified the Obbia lark as belonging to the genus Calandrella.

References

Obbia lark
Endemic birds of Somalia
Obbia lark
Taxonomy articles created by Polbot
Hobyo grasslands and shrublands